Cristian Garín was the defending champion but chose not to defend his title.

Juan Pablo Varillas won the title after defeating Juan Pablo Ficovich 2–6, 7–6(7–4), 6–2 in the final.

Seeds
All seeds receive a bye into the second round.

Draw

Finals

Top half

Section 1

Section 2

Bottom half

Section 3

Section 4

References

External links
Main draw
Qualifying draw

2019 ATP Challenger Tour
2019 Singles